General elections were held in Pakistan on 24 October 1990 to elect the members of the National Assembly. The elections were primarily a contest between the People's Democratic Alliance (PDA, a four party alliance led by the ruling Pakistan Peoples Party (PPP) of Benazir Bhutto) and the conservative nine-party alliance, Islami Jamhoori Ittehad (IJI) headed by Nawaz Sharif.

President Ghulam Ishaq Khan dissolved the National Assembly and dismissed Bhutto's government in August 1990 on charges of corruption and maladministration. However, the PPP was still extremely popular and there was a fear amongst anti-PPP forces that it might be re-elected. Numerous steps were taken by Ishaq with help of the military establishment to sway the results in favour of the IJI, including the appointment of IJI chairman Ghulam Mustafa Jatoi as caretaker Prime Minister. Despite their efforts, the PPP remained ahead in opinion polls.

However, the result was a surprise victory for the IJI, which won 111 of the 207 seats. The PDA won just 44 seats amidst a voter turnout of only 45%. The IJI's parliamentary leader Sharif became Prime Minister while Bhutto became the Opposition Leader. In 2012 the Supreme Court ruled that the elections had been rigged.

Background
The PPP led by Benazir Bhutto had won a plurality of seats in the 1988 election and Bhutto became Prime Minister. However by 1990 there was discontent over rising lawlessness, allegations of corruption and the failure of the government to fulfill the promises it had made during the 1988 campaign.

Parties
The PPP formed an alliance with three other parties, Tehreek-e-Nifaz-e-Fiqh-e-Jafariya, Tehreek-e-Istiqlal and the Pakistan Muslim League (Chatta), running under the name People's Democratic Alliance.

Campaign
By the start of the campaign reports suggested that Bhutto and the PDA were in a stronger position as the caretaker government failed to produce sufficient evidence to prove any charges against her.

At the end of the campaign Bhutto led hundreds of thousands of supporters in a procession in Lahore, while Sharif held a rally for about ten thousand nearby.

Electoral fraud
On 19 October 2012, the Supreme Court of Pakistan ruled on a petition by Asghar Khan, requesting that the court probe allegations that the 1990 elections had been rigged. The court officially ruled that two Army Generals – Mirza Aslam Baig and Asad Durrani (Head of the ISI) – along with President Ghulam Ishaq Khan – had provided financial assistance to favoured parties. The motive was to deliberately weaken the mandate of the Pakistan Peoples Party. It was believed that the PPP, led by Benazir Bhutto, was a liability to the nation.

Results
IJI won the popular vote by a very narrow margin of only around 100,000 votes, but the narrow victory in the popular vote translated into 106 seats for IJI against the PDA's 44 seats. The popular argument regarding PDA's huge loss of seats is that the PDA's vote, despite being almost equal to that of IJI, was much more spread out whereas IJI's vote bank was more concentrated. This resulted in PDA candidates losing in IJI won seats by narrow margins.

References

General elections in Pakistan
1990 elections in Pakistan
Pakistan
October 1990 events in Asia
Electoral fraud in Pakistan
Election and referendum articles with incomplete results